Marrying Widows is a 1934 American pre-Code drama film directed by Sam Newfield and starring Judith Allen, Johnny Mack Brown and Minna Gombell.

Synopsis
After the death of her sewing machine tycoon husband, a young woman is cold-shouldered by her grasping in-laws. She heads to New York City and meets a man, falls in love and gets married. Unknown to her her new husband is after what he thinks to be her fortune, in revenge for the theft of his father's patents that made the sewing machine profits. Discovering that she is in fact penniless, they both reconcile.

Cast
 Judith Allen as The Widow
 Johnny Mack Brown as The Husband 
 Minna Gombell as The Press Agent
 Lucien Littlefield as The Brother-In-Law
 Bert Roach as The Husband's Partner
 Sarah Padden		
 Virginia Sale
 Nat Carr		
 Arthur Hoyt		
 Otto Hoffman	
 Syd Saylor	
 Gladys Blake		
 George Grandee

References

Bibliography
Parish, James Robert & Pitts, Michael R. Film directors: a guide to their American films. Scarecrow Press, 1974.

External links
 

1934 films
1934 drama films
1930s English-language films
American drama films
Films directed by Sam Newfield
American black-and-white films
1930s American films